Hayden Lane Dunhurst (born September 19, 2000) is an American professional baseball catcher in the Kansas City Royals organization.

Amateur career
Dunhurst attended Pearl River Central High School in Carriere, Mississippi. He committed to play college baseball for the Ole Miss Rebels after his freshman year, when he hit four home runs and boasted a .476 slugging percentage. Dunhurst did not attend baseball camps or take lessons, but instead modeled his catching techniques after Yadier Molina and Salvador Pérez by watching YouTube videos. During his sophomore year in 2017, Dunhurst hit ten home runs with 37 RBIs and nine doubles. As a senior in 2019, he batted .369 with 11 home runs and 37 RBIs. He ended his high school career with 31 home runs. He was selected by the Colorado Rockies in the 37th round of the 2019 Major League Baseball draft, but did not sign.

As a freshman at Ole Miss in 2020, Dunhurst appeared in 17 games and batted .269 with five home runs before the season was cancelled due to the COVID-19 pandemic. In 2021, as a redshirt freshman, Dunhurst made 65 starts and slashed .280/.385/.435 with seven home runs, 43 RBIs, and 11 doubles. He won the ABCA/Rawlings Gold Glove award at catcher. After the season, he was named to the USA Baseball Collegiate National Team. Dunhurst entered the 2022 season as a top prospect for the upcoming draft. He missed a brief period at the beginning of the season after tweaking a hamstring. He ended the season batting .231 with six home runs and thirty RBIs over 56 games, helping lead Ole Miss to their first ever NCAA Championship.

Professional career
Dunhurst was drafted by the Kansas City Royals in the sixth round with the 175th overall selection of the 2022 Major League Baseball draft. He signed with the team for $300,000.

Dunhurst made his professional debut with the Arizona Complex League Royals.

References

External links
Ole Miss Rebels bio

2000 births
Living people
Baseball players from Mississippi
Baseball catchers
Ole Miss Rebels baseball players
United States national baseball team players
Arizona Complex League Royals players